Vizbegovo is a neighbourhood in the municipality of Butel, North Macedonia. It used to be part of  Čair Municipality. The Skopje Aqueduct archaeological site is located within the vicinity of the neighbourhood.

Demographics
According to the 2021 census, the neighbourhood had a total of 3.748 inhabitants. Ethnic groups in the neighbourhood include:
Albanians 2.672
Macedonians 599
Serbs 40 
Romani 88
Bosniaks 28
Vlachs 4
Turks 56
Others 261

References

External links

Villages in Butel Municipality
Albanian communities in North Macedonia